Gil Lockhart (born 7 April 1945) is a former Australian rules footballer who played with Carlton and North Melbourne in the Victorian Football League (VFL).

Notes

External links 

Gil Lockhart's profile at Blueseum

1945 births
Carlton Football Club players
Australian rules footballers from Victoria (Australia)
Living people